This is a list of extinct languages of Central America and the Caribbean, languages which have undergone language death, have no native speakers, and no spoken descendants.

There are 14 languages listed, 7 lost in Central America and 7 lost in the Caribbean.

Central America

Costa Rica 
Chorotega

El Salvador 
Cacaopera

Guatemala 
Chicomuceltec

Honduras 
Lenca

Nicaragua 

Matagalpa
Monimbo
Subtiaba

The Caribbean 

Ciguayo
Guanahatabey
Island Carib
Macorix (Northern and Southern dialects)
Shebaya
Taíno (Classic Taíno and Ciboney Taíno dialects)
Yao

Central America or Caribbean
Extinct languages
Extinct languages
 Extinct
 Extinct
Central America and the Caribbean